Sok Chanphal (born August 27, 1984) is a Cambodian songwriter who got the S.E.A. Write Award in 2013.

Awards and honours
 S.E.A. Write Award (2013)

Related websites

References

Cambodian songwriters
1984 births
Living people
S.E.A. Write Award winners
People from Kampong Cham province